Shakera Kiella Valena Reece, (born 31 August 1988) is a Barbadian sprinter, who won a bronze medal at the 2011 Pan American Games.

Reece competed for Rice University. At Rice, Reece competed in sprinting events, such as the 100 meter dash and 200 meter dash. She ran 11.34 in the 100 meter dash in 2007 in Turks & Caicos to place first at the 2007 CARIFTA Games Under-20 championships.

References

External links
 Rice University profile
 World Athletics

1988 births
Living people
Barbadian female sprinters
Athletes (track and field) at the 2007 Pan American Games
Athletes (track and field) at the 2010 Commonwealth Games
Athletes (track and field) at the 2011 Pan American Games
Commonwealth Games competitors for Barbados
Pan American Games medalists in athletics (track and field)
Pan American Games bronze medalists for Barbados
Rice Owls women's track and field athletes
Medalists at the 2011 Pan American Games